Guam Highway 27 (GH-27), also known as Hamburger Highway or Harmon Loop Road, is a short highway in the United States territory of Guam. The highway runs in an east–west direction from a junction with GH-16 to a junction with GH-1, and is located almost entirely in the southern region of the city of Dededo. The highway gets its name from the fact that it provides access to a large McDonald's restaurant located at the intersection with GH-16.

Route description
GH 27 begins at an intersection with GH 16 (Army Drive). The highway begins as a six lane, paved highway, and proceeds east, passing a few small businesses, including a small hotel. The highway continues past several small businesses and the Juan Mendiola Guerrero Elementary School. The highway continues past a few large neighborhoods, before intersecting GH 1, and passing a few small businesses in the process. The highway terminates at this intersection.

Major junctions

Related route

Guam Highway 27A (GH-27A) is a  territorial highway in the U.S. overseas territory of Guam. It stretches from GH-28 at its eastern terminus to GH-16 at its western terminus, intersecting with GH-1 as it does so.

See also

References

27